Lan Ekintza Bilbao is the local development agency of the Bilbao City Council with a public service mission, which started operations in 1989. Its remit is to improve the quality of life of the citizens and the city of Bilbao, ensuring that development maintains a socio-economic balance among the city's districts and their residents.

Lan Ekintza's responsibilities include employment offices, promoting city trade, and boosting entrepreneurship and innovation.

Targets
 Job seekers.
 Marginalised social collectives.
 Individuals needing training.
 Young entrepreneurs.
 SMEs and Microcompanies.
 Companies seeking advisory services.
 Bilbao shops.
 Institutions and Social Stakeholders.

Impact indicators

Employment
Total 2000-2009
People processed: 38,728 people
People finding jobs: 16,225 people
People contracted: 2,807 people
Participation in programmes for Vocational Training/Qualifications: 10,741 people

Entrepreneurship
Total 2000-2009
People processed: 12,335 people
Companies receiving support: 923 people
Direct employment generated: 1,712 people
Investment made: €37,860,830

Commerce
Total 2009
Business information queries: 97
Individualised diagnostics: 53
Advice at the retail outlet: 57
Subsidies awarded: €76,500 
Training actions: 130 stores
Support for Bilbao Dendak and Bilbao Traders Association: €357,000

Bilbao
Government of Spain
1989 establishments in Spain